Clara Marie Horton (July 29, 1904 – December 4, 1976) was an American actress of the silent film era. 

Horton was born in Brooklyn. Her mother gave up a career as a piano soloist and instructor to raise her baby. She planned for Clara to have a career as a pianist and began teaching her when she had to lift the girl to the piano bench. When Clara was five years old, however, a director employed by the Eclair Company saw the girl and asked her mother to let her appear in a film. Her mother signed a contract, and the Hortons moved to Tucson, Arizona. When Eclair went out of business, they moved to Los Angeles, where work with other studios was available. She appeared in more than 80 films between 1912 and 1942. 

When Horton was 17, she got married and left the film business. The marriage did not last, and she returned to working in films. She joined the Warner stock company and as of 1934 she was playing bit parts and was a stand-in for stars.

After her work in films ended, Horton was a saleslady in Whittier, California. She is buried in Rose Hills Memorial Park.

Selected filmography

References

External links

1904 births
1976 deaths
Actresses from New York (state)
American child actresses
American film actresses
American silent film actresses
People from Brooklyn
20th-century American actresses
Burials at Rose Hills Memorial Park